The oath of office of the vice president of the United States is the oath or affirmation that the vice president of the United States takes upon assuming the vice-presidency but before beginning the execution of the office. It is the same oath that members of the United States Congress and members of the president's cabinet take upon entering office.

Before the president-elect takes the oath of office on Inauguration Day, the vice president-elect will step forward on the inaugural platform and repeat the oath of office to ensure that the vice president can potentially be elevated to president if an unforeseen event (death, illness, etc.) caused the president-elect to not be able to assume the office. Although the United States Constitution—Article II, Section One, Clause 8—specifically sets forth the oath required by incoming presidents, it does not do so for incoming vice presidents. The constitution—Article VI, Clause 3— simply requires that they, along with all other government officers (federal and state; elected and appointed), pledge to support the Constitution. Since 1937, Inauguration Day has been January 20 (was March 4 previously), a change brought about by the  20th amendment to the Constitution, which had been ratified four years earlier. The vice president's swearing-in ceremony also moved that year, from the Senate chamber inside the Capitol, to the presidential inaugural platform outside the building.

The oath is as follows:

Background

The 1st Congress passed an oath act in May 1789, authorizing only U.S. senators to administer the oath to the vice president (who serves as the president of the Senate). Later that year, legislation passed that allowed courts to administer all oaths and affirmations. Since 1789, the oath has been changed several times by Congress. The present oath repeated by the vice president, senators, representatives, and other government officers has been in use since 1884.

When the vice presidency was established in 1789, and for the century that followed, the vice president was sworn in on the same date as the president, March 4, but at a separate location, typically in the United States Senate, where the vice president holds the office of President of the Senate. Up until the middle of the 20th century, the vice president-elect nearly always would be sworn in by the highest-ranking officer of the U.S. Senate which was the outgoing vice president or the president pro tempore of the United States Senate. Sometimes, although not always, a short address would be given by the new vice president to the Senate.

The oath of office has been administered most by the president pro tempore of the United States Senate (last in 1925) for a total of 20 times. Others to give the oath of office include the outgoing vice president (last in 1945) 12 times, an associate justice of the Supreme Court of the United States (last in 2021) 10 times, the chief justice of the United States (last in 2001) 6 times, U.S. senators that are not President Pro Tempore of the Senate (last in 1969) 5 times, the speaker of the United States House of Representatives (last in 2005) 4 times, a U.S. judge twice, and a U.S. consul once with one time being unrecorded. Former Chief Justice Warren E. Burger gave the oath the most times with three.

Of the 59 times the oath of office has been administered, 47 times have been at some location in the United States Capitol. The White House has seen 3 oaths of office, and Congress Hall in Philadelphia twice. The following locations all had the oath administered once in that location: Federal Hall, Old Brick Capitol, Havana, Cuba, a private residence in New York, and the Number One Observatory Circle. Reflecting the relative lack of importance of the office in the early 19th century, there are two instances where the location of the vice president's oath of office is unknown.

Due to Vice President-elect William R. King's deteriorating health, a bill signed on March 3, 1853, the last day of the 32nd United States Congress, allowed for the oath to be administered to him as he rested in Havana, Cuba. To date, King's swearing-in as vice president is the only occasion on foreign soil.

Oath-taking ceremonies

Notes: Entries in the above list with an asterisk (*) indicate the official legal oath of office for terms of office that began on Sunday instead of the public ceremonial swearing-in the following day.

Oath mishaps 

 In 1989 during Dan Quayle’s swearing in, Supreme Court Justice Sandra Day O’Connor skipped the line “against all enemies, foreign and domestic.”
 In 2021, Supreme Court Justice Sonia Sotomayor mispronounced Kamala Harris's  first name while administering the vice presidential oath. When Harris was to repeat the oath after the justice, she said her own name correctly and the rest of the oath continued as planned. Harris accepted Sotomayor's apology after the event.

References

http://americanhistory.about.com/od/uspresidents/ss/inauguration_4.htm
http://memory.loc.gov/cgi-bin/ampage?collId=llsj&fileName=001/llsj001.db&recNum=11&itemLink=r?ammem/hlaw:@field%28DOCID+@lit%28sj0011%29%29:%230010001&linkText=1
http://memory.loc.gov/cgi-bin/ampage?collId=llsj&fileName=002/llsj002.db&recNum=1&itemLink=r?ammem/hlaw:@field%28DOCID+@lit%28sj0021%29%29:%230020002&linkText=1
http://memory.loc.gov/cgi-bin/ampage?collId=llsj&fileName=003/llsj003.db&recNum=145&itemLink=r?ammem/hlaw:@field%28DOCID+@lit%28sj003205%29%29:%230030145&linkText=1
Tyler - http://memory.loc.gov/cgi-bin/query/r?ammem/hlaw:@field%28DOCID+@lit%28sj03169%29%29:
Dallas - http://memory.loc.gov/cgi-bin/query/r?ammem/hlaw:@field%28DOCID+@lit%28sj03663%29%29:
Tyler - http://memory.loc.gov/cgi-bin/query/r?ammem/hlaw:@field%28DOCID+@lit%28sj03169%29%29:
Dallas - http://memory.loc.gov/cgi-bin/query/r?ammem/hlaw:@field%28DOCID+@lit%28sj03663%29%29:
Fillmore - http://memory.loc.gov/cgi-bin/query/r?ammem/hlaw:@field%28DOCID+@lit%28sj04071%29%29:
http://www.aoc.gov/nations-stage/vice-president-inaugurations
https://web.archive.org/web/20140920162742/https://www.senate.gov/artandhistory/history/common/generic/VP_Nelson_Rockefeller.htm

Oaths
Oath of office